91.7 WCUC FM is a fully operational, FCC-licensed, non-commercial educational, student-run radio station under the Department of Communication that is operated with the intention of being a student learning lab for Clarion University of Pennsylvania.

WCUC-FM is dedicated to connecting Clarion County and the surrounding areas through unique, high-quality music, performance and public affairs programming that informs, educates, entertains, and inspires listeners.

WCUC-FM is located at G55 Becker Hall, 840 Wood St., Clarion, PA 16214

WCUC-FM has nine functional departments: Programming, Sports, News, Events, Promotions, Staff Development, Music, Production and Underwriting, and a station and assistant station manager.

History 
WCUC was founded in September 1977 as Clarion University’s FM radio station.  The newly formed station guaranteed a variety of entertainment and something for everyone.  WCUC received its FCC licensing earlier in the year on April 26, 1977.

From 1977 through the decades until today, WCUC’s mission had been to serve the community and the college with an alternative sound in radio and bring them the best in news, sports and music.

WCUC’s first broadcast was on September 12, 1977 with a 1000-watt station giving it an audience radius of 40 miles.  WCUC, at that time broadcast from 3 pm to 12 midnight, giving the Clarion area its very first late-night FM station.

WCUC celebrated its 30th Aaniversary in April 2007 during Clarion University’s media day down across from the Court House at Spring Fling.

Board of directors 
WCUC’s board of directors consists of directors of each department and their assistants.  It also includes the station manager, assistant station manager, and the advisors of the organization.  Departments of WCUC are Program, Music, Production, Underwriting, Promotions, Events, Sports, News and Staff Development.

Departments

Station manager 
The station manager of WCUC-FM is responsible for overseeing day-to-day operations of the radio station. The duties and powers of the station manager are to preside over and conduct all station and executive board meetings, enforce the bylaws and maintain general order of the station, to maintain a relationship and meet individually with faculty and WCUC staff to discuss any issues or problems.
The station manager is also granted a limited power to make command decisions, when a situations arise. Command decisions must be made with the utmost respect and responsibility for the station.  S/he is responsible for being the liaison between Clarion University faculty and staff, including, but not limited to the Chief Operating Engineer, faculty advisor, and department chair.

Assistant Station Manager 
Is responsible for the up keeping of the stations website and to assume the responsibilities of the stations manager in the station managers’ absence.

Program Department 
Programming is responsible for the overseeing the rules and regulations of on-air content.  The program department creates and oversees the schedules for production, events, and programming, as well as the planning and upkeep of the program log.  For live remotes, the program director will create a schedule for DJs in reference to call-ins.  The Director also works with the DJ trainer and music director to ensure the compliance of all on-air DJs with the rules and regulations of the station.

Music Department 
Responsible for selection of new recordings to be played as they are submitted by record companies.  As well, the music department is responsible for managing the station’s music library, and loading new music, programs, PSA’s, station imaging and promotional spots in the music system.  It is under the responsibility of the music director to decide the format of songs received, as well as if the songs will be aired or not.

Production Department 
Production is responsible for assigning announcers for voice work, scheduling studio time, arranging recording sessions and producing underwriting spots and station imaging. Also assists with on-air DJs with creating promotional spots and is responsible for training any member of the station to use production equipment.  Production is also responsible for maintaining the live-remote equipment, as well as the set-up, operation, and tear down of any live remote event.

Underwriting Department 
Underwriting is responsible for obtaining the underwriting grants from local businesses and organizations, as well as clubs and departments of Clarion University.  Works with production department and chief engineer to complete a script and promotional spot.

Promotions Department 
Promotes WCUC-FM and its content to the surrounding communities.  Attains and distributes products for on-air giveaways, and distribute the monthly news letter.

Events Department 
Events is responsible for scheduling of any events or live-remotes.  Works with entire station to schedule and set-up all events and live remotes, and to make sure that each event runs smoothly as possible.

Sports Department 
Works with the athletic department of Clarion University to select sporting events for on-air coverage, including, assigning play-by-play and color commentary for each sporting event.

News Department 
Responsible for finding news stories that are relevant to the interests of surrounding communities.  Rewrites the news into broadcast format, so as not to violate the copyright of any news organization, as well as obtain interviews with people from the surrounding communities.  The news department also attends Clarion Borough Council events and meetings.

Staff Development Department 
Training of all on-air DJs, make sure DJs have learned all required material including FCC obscenity laws, working of station equipment, EBS and other DJ guideline which can be found in the 91.7 WCUC rules and regulations.

On-air staff and broadcasting 
DJs are trained under the rules and regulations of 91.7 WCUC-FM and regulations and laws of the FCC.  WCUC-FM is a free format radio station; allowing DJs to be granted complete control over their playlists.  For a full list of on-air DJ staff, visit the WCUC-FM website for times and genes.

91.7 WCUC-FM broadcasts with a 3200-watt station, which has the capabilities of broadcasting 60 miles in any direction.

In August 2005 WCUC acquired an automation system manufactured by Scotts Studios Inc. now known as Wide Orbit Radio Automation Inc.  The Scotts System allowed WCUC to go from broadcasting from 6 am to midnight to 24 hours.  The Scotts system allows WCUC to have a computer to schedule songs, according to pre set schedules when DJs are not present.

WCUC has a state of the art hybrid transmitter, making WCUC capable of broadcasting in IBOC, digital and analog when desired (WCUC is currently only broadcasting in analog).

91.7 WCUC-FM is an authorized Emergency Broadcast System station, connected to issuing agencies via satellite, internet, and radio monitoring allowing WCUC to broadcast emergency alerts, emergency notifications, and Amber Alerts.

References

Sources

External links

CUC-FM
CUC-FM
Radio stations established in 1977